Liff or LIFF may refer to:

People with the family name
 Biff Liff (1919-2015), Tony Award-winning American Broadway manager and producer.
 Vincent Liff (1915-2003), American film director from West Hartford, Connecticut.

Other
 Liff, Angus, village in Scotland
The Meaning of Liff, a book by Douglas Adams and John Lloyd

LIFF as abbreviation
 Ladakh International Film Festival, India
 Layered Image File Format
 Leeds International Film Festival, West Yorkshire, England
 Leiden International Film Festival, The Netherlands
 Ljubljana International Film Festival, Slovenia
 London Independent Film Festival, London, England